Claudio Canti (born 15 June 1965) is a retired Sammarinese football defender.

References

1965 births
Living people
Sammarinese footballers
S.S. Folgore Falciano Calcio players
A.C. Juvenes/Dogana players
Association football defenders
San Marino international footballers